St. Philip the Apostle Catholic School, Camp Springs, Maryland, (known as St. Philips) is a Catholic school in Camp Springs, Maryland within the Archdiocese of Washington.

Description
The school is located at 5414 Henderson Way, Camp Springs, MD 20746.  The school is part of the St. Philips parish.  The school ranges from pre-kindergarten — grade 8.

Athletics
The School's track & field team placed 3rd in the CYO track and field championship behind Saint Ambrose Catholic School and Holy Family School in 2012. Their Boys Varsity Basketball team placed 5th in the CYO Division A. The Varsity Soccer Teams had an undefeated season in 2010, but however they have been going downhill since, with a 5–5 record in 2011 and a 0–10 record in 2012.

St. Philip the Apostle Catholic School is the parish school of St. Philip the Apostle Catholic Church at Camp Springs, MD.

Notable alumni
Erin Wright

Private middle schools in Maryland
Private elementary schools in Maryland
Catholic schools in Maryland
Schools in Prince George's County, Maryland